Liu Kang is a fictional character in the Mortal Kombat fighting game series by Midway Games and NetherRealm Studios. Depicted as Earthrealm's greatest warrior and champion, he is generally the main hero of the series. He debuted in the original 1992 game as a Shaolin monk, and has since appeared in nearly every main installment of the series except Mortal Kombat: Deadly Alliance and its second version. He is also a protagonist of the action-adventure beat 'em up spinoff game Mortal Kombat: Shaolin Monks (2005).

The character's storyline sees him win the eponymous Mortal Kombat tournament in the first and second games, saving Earthrealm from being conquered by the opposing forces of Outworld. During both the original and rebooted timelines, Liu Kang receives a more villainous depiction after he is killed, appearing as a reanimated corpse in the former and an undead revenant who rules the Netherrealm in the latter. He returns to his heroic role in Mortal Kombat 11 (2019), in which he becomes a fire god.

Liu Kang has appeared in various alternate media outside of the games, including as the hero of the 1995 film adaptation and its 1997 sequel Mortal Kombat: Annihilation. Reception of the character has been mainly favorable for his special moves, gameplay, and his role throughout the series.

Character design

Original concept sketches for a proposed Midway Games fighting title by artist John Tobias featured a Japanese character named Minamoto Yoshitsune. However, during production of what would become Mortal Kombat, the Midway staff "just couldn't deal with the name," according to Tobias, the game's lead character designer. The character was renamed Liu Kang as a nod to actor Gordon Liu, who starred in the 1978 film The 36th Chamber of Shaolin, and with his ethnicity subsequently changed to Chinese, he "was originally going to be a traditional monk — bald and in robes". Liu Kang was played by Korean actor and martial artist Ho-Sung Pak in the first two games, but Pak's refusal to shave his head resulted in the character instead being modeled after Bruce Lee and depicted as "a renegade monk [who] grew his hair back". Tobias additionally drew inspiration from the 1973 film Enter the Dragon in developing Liu Kang's backstory.

Liu Kang's design in the first game had him shirtless with short hair, while wearing only black pants and white shoes. Starting with Mortal Kombat II, his outfit was enhanced with a red palette by way of single vertical stripes on his pants and a matching headband, in addition to black shoes and studded wrist guards. Mortal Kombat 3 contained minor changes of longer hair and thin black leg strips wrapped above his ankles in order to give him a "sleeker" look.  Lead series programmer Ed Boon said in a 1995 interview of the development team's decision to include Liu Kang in Mortal Kombat 3: "It'd be like doing part three of Star Wars and not having Luke Skywalker in there. You don't do that."

In Mortal Kombat 4, a red tank top was added to Liu Kang's outfit while his alternate design showed him shirtless with blue-striped pants. This design was carried over into Mortal Kombat: Deception and the compilation title Mortal Kombat: Armageddon, but due to his resurrection therein as a zombie, his skin was ash gray and he wore hooked chains around his wrists, while his alternate costume featured him as a living person in order to contrast his undead form. The character's death in the previous game, Mortal Kombat: Deadly Alliance, inspired the composition of a "funeral song" by series music composer Dan Forden, titled "Liu Kang's Tomb" and included in Deception in the arena containing his tomb.

Liu Kang again retained his MK3 design in the 2008 crossover fighting game Mortal Kombat vs. DC Universe, accentuated with a championship belt adorned with the Mortal Kombat dragon emblem. Tobias, who departed Midway in 1999, said in a 2012 interview that had he continued to work on Mortal Kombat, he would have kept the plot centered around Liu Kang and then his son.

Gameplay

Liu Kang was the lone character in the original Mortal Kombat whose Fatality (a finishing move that executes defeated opponents) did not explicitly kill his opponent and feature the background dimming beforehand, because he was depicted therein as a Shaolin monk who, in general, have strict beliefs regarding killing and murder. The finisher, titled "Shaolin Uppercut" and created by his actor Ho-Sung Pak, has him perform a butterfly kick (often mistaken for a cartwheel) on his opponent before landing an uppercut that knocks them offscreen before landing. According to Tobias, the background not darkening during the finisher was a glitch that was kept in and rationalized as symbolizing Liu Kang's noble motivations.

While the "Shaolin Uppercut" was carried over into Mortal Kombat II, Liu Kang was otherwise given more graphic Fatalities thereafter as he was depicted by Midway as having "strong Shaolin beliefs, but was no longer a part of the Shaolin monks." He was additionally designed as a character that both casual and experienced gamers could play as with little difficulty. Liu Kang specializes in kicks, with his most common move a flying kick that launches him across the screen to connect with his opponent's torso. MKII introduced another of the character's signature special moves, the "Bicycle Kick", which again propels him across the screen with a flurry of kicks targeting the opponent's midsection and resembling the pedaling of a bicycle. A different kind of his signature abilities is the "Dragon Fire": with it Liu Kang sends a fiery flame in the shape of a Chinese dragon across the screen out of his hands at his opponent. After Mortal Kombat II, he gains the ability to perform the "Dragon Fire" while crouching and in the air, also for Deception and Armageddon. Liu Kang was immediately selectable in Mortal Kombat: Unchained, the PlayStation Portable port of Deception, after the developers had received feedback that unlocking him in Deception had proved difficult.

In Mortal Kombat: Shaolin Monks, there were two versions; one where the victim explodes into pieces upon impact and the original, in which the opponent is torn to pieces upon falling to the ground. In another signature Fatality, he morphs into a large dragon, chomping the upper body of his opponent. This Fatality was turned into an Animality in Mortal Kombat 3 and back into a normal Fatality in Mortal Kombat 4. In the Game Boy and Game Gear versions of Mortal Kombat II, the dragon torches the opponent with fire instead. The series' composer and co-designer John Vogel noted it to be his favorite Fatality due to how much Liu Kang's appearance changes. Another famous Fatality of Liu Kang has him vanish and a Mortal Kombat arcade game machine drop down and crush his opponent. According to GameSpy's MK9 walkthrough, Liu Kang "inflicts better damage" than Kung Lao "by jumping around like a lunatic and kicking the crap out of everything he sees."

Appearances

Mortal Kombat games

In Midway Games
Introduced in the first Mortal Kombat game as a Chinese Shaolin Kung Fu monk, Liu Kang enters the tenth Mortal Kombat tournament in order to protect Earthrealm from being destroyed. He defeats Grand Champion Goro and the tournament host, the nefarious sorcerer Shang Tsung, and emerges as the new Mortal Kombat champion.

In the 1993 sequel Mortal Kombat II (1993), after winning the Earthrealm tournament Liu Kang returns home and finds many of his Shaolin brethren were killed in a vicious attack by a horde of nomadic mutants led by Baraka under orders from the evil Outworld emperor Shao Kahn, Shang Tsung's master. Enraged, Liu Kang travels to Outworld to seek revenge, backed by a friend and fellow Shaolin monk Kung Lao. At the tournament, Liu Kang defeats Shao Kahn.

In Mortal Kombat 3 (1995), Liu Kang and his friends fight against Shao Kahn's extermination squad, which invaded Earthrealm. He once again defeats the Emperor, causing him and his forces to retreat back to Outworld.

In Mortal Kombat 4 (1997), Liu Kang discovers that his lover and ally, Princess Kitana, has been captured by the disgraced Elder God Shinnok's forces, and begins gathering Earth's warriors to defeat him. Liu Kang confronts Shinnok and once again emerges victorious, with Kitana and her people had survived the attack, but he is unable to commit himself to a relationship due to his duty as Earthrealm's champion while Kitana has to remain in Edenia to rule her kingdom.

Liu Kang becomes unplayable for the first and only time in the Mortal Kombat series in 2002's Mortal Kombat: Deadly Alliance, in which the titular partnership of Shang Tsung and fellow sorcerer Quan Chi join forces to kill him in the game's introductory sequence.

In Mortal Kombat: Deception (2004), an unknown party reanimates Liu Kang's corpse and sends it on a murderous rampage, leaving his soul to attempt to regain control. He returns as a playable character in this game, albeit in an undead form and as a secret character that can only be unlocked by completing the game's training mode. His spirit enlists the reformed ninja Ermac to try to save Kitana and his Earthrealm allies from the Dragon King Onaga.

Liu Kang is still unable to fully regain control of his body in Mortal Kombat: Armageddon (2006), where he is playable along with the entire series roster, and in which it is revealed that the thunder god Raiden had revived Liu Kang's corpse in Deception. Liu Kang's bond with Kitana had succeeded in keeping his power in check, with Nightwolf then assuming her position as Liu Kang's "spiritual anchor" in an attempt to find a way to reunite his body and soul, which he accomplishes in his ending.

Along with Kung Lao, Liu Kang is the lead character in the 2005 spin-off action-adventure game Mortal Kombat: Shaolin Monks, which serves as a retelling of the events leading up to Mortal Kombat II and features the two Shaolin monks traveling to Outworld to find and defeat Shang Tsung and Shao Kahn, rescuing Kitana along the way.

Liu Kang is among the eleven characters representing the Mortal Kombat franchise in the title Mortal Kombat vs. DC Universe (2008), which features fights between characters from the Mortal Kombat and the DC Comics universes. In this game, Liu Kang appears as the protagonist of the first chapter of the Mortal Kombat story mode. Tobias said that the fight he expected to see in the game was between Liu Kang and Batman as he noted their back-stories are very similar, as both attempt to help their respective leaders regain their senses.

NetherRealm Studios titles
In the  Mortal Kombat reboot game (2011), which serves as a retelling of the first three games, Liu Kang reprises his role from the first three tournaments as one of Raiden's chosen warriors. Despite his victory over Shang Tsung in the first tournament, Raiden starts having visions of Shao Kahn, which leads to Kung Lao taking Liu Kang's role. However, Kung Lao is killed by Shao Kahn and Liu Kang nearly kills his nemesis in revenge. When Shao Kahn prepares to invade Earthrealm following the second tournament, all of Liu Kang's allies are murdered by a soul-infused Sindel. This, coupled with Raiden's failed attempts to change the future, causes Liu Kang to grow more and more disillusioned with him. This eventually leads to Raiden accidentally killing Liu Kang while attempting to stop Shao Kahn.

Liu Kang returns in Mortal Kombat X. In the game's story mode, Quan Chi resurrects him as an undead revenant to serve him. He fights Jax and Raiden, blaming the latter for his death. Following Quan Chi's death and Shinnok's defeat, he and Kitana become the new rulers of the Netherrealm. They are visited by Raiden, who brings them Shinnok's disembodied head as a warning for them not to attack Earthrealm.

In Mortal Kombat 11, Liu Kang plans to invade Earthrealm. After Raiden and the Special Forces destroy his castle in the Netherrealm, Liu Kang and his allies join the keeper of time, Kronika, in forging a new timeline without Raiden. While making preparations however, she creates a time storm that brings a younger version of Liu Kang to the present. Despite learning of what happened to him and an encounter with his revenant, Liu Kang continues to trust Raiden and aligns himself with Earthrealm's warriors to combat Kronika. When he clashes with Raiden after the latter uses Shinnok's amulet to strengthen himself, the thunder god discovers that Kronika manipulated them into fighting across multiple different timelines as she fears their combined power. Kronika kidnaps the past Liu Kang so his revenant can absorb his soul. Rather than kill him, Raiden merges with the revenant and younger Liu Kang, transforming them into "Fire God Liu Kang". With Raiden's godly powers and his revenant counterpart's knowledge of Kronika's plan, he storms Kronika's keep and engages her in battle. In the game's bad ending, Kronika kills Liu Kang and ushers in her New Era. In one of two good endings, Liu Kang defeats Kronika and is either joined by a mortal Raiden or Kitana in shaping a new timeline. In the DLC story expansion Aftermath, Liu Kang and Raiden attempt to restart the history, only to be interrupted by Shang Tsung, Nightwolf and Fujin, who tell them they need Kronika's Crown of Souls in order to do so. As Liu Kang destroyed his version of it, the sorcerer has the Fire God send him, Fujin, and Nightwolf back in time to retrieve a past version of the Crown. While Shang Tsung is successful, he reneges on the deal and attempts to restart history for himself after defeating Kronika. However, he discovers that Liu Kang had manipulated events to ensure his victory, having known that the sorcerer would betray everyone from the beginning and privately tasked Fujin to keep an eye on him during the journey to secure the crown. In the expansion's bad ending, Shang Tsung kills Liu Kang, absorbing his soul and power for himself. In the good ending, Liu Kang erases Shang Tsung from history and, in the process of forging his New Era, visits Kung Lao's ancestor to give him special training for his future battles.

Other media

Printed media
Liu Kang was the hero of the comic book adaptation of the Mortal Kombat series Malibu Comics. In the first miniseries, Blood and Thunder, his backstory was mostly kept intact as a Shaolin monk out to restore the tournament to their righteous owners, with the only difference being that he was not the chosen one to defeat Goro, which instead fell on twin monk brothers named Sing and Sang, two original characters created specifically for the comics; after they are killed by Goro in the third issue, Liu Kang becomes the Shaolin's only hope in defeating Shang Tsung. The following miniseries, Battlewave, stated that Liu Kang won the first tournament after defeating Goro, which never appeared in the first miniseries. He returns to his normal life as an architect in Chicago, having left the Order of Light before the events of the first series. However, he suffers from constant attacks by an unknown force of ninjas and later receives help from Johnny Cage's bodyguard Bo when Goro ambushes him in an office building. Eventually he decides to travel to Outworld, realizing that he cannot avoid Mortal Kombat.

In the Midway Comics, Liu Kang reprises his role from the first game's prologue, focusing first on dealing with the criminal Kano. Mortal Kombat II Collector's Edition starts with Liu Kang winning the first tournament and then meeting the ninja Sub-Zero in the aftermath. When clashing the other realm's forces, Raiden instructs Liu Kang to enter into the next competition. A prologue of Mortal Kombat 4 was also written, dealing with Liu Kang and his new ally Kai as they prepare to face Shinnok's forces.

Film and television

Liu Kang is the main protagonist of two Mortal Kombat films, in which he is played by Robin Shou. Director Paul W. S. Anderson wanted Liu Kang's character to be "really engaging" and cast Shou, noting his skills with martial arts. Anderson compared Shou with Jackie Chan due to how both actors did not rely on stunts for their movies. In the first film, he takes part in the tournament out of guilt over his brother's death at the hands of Shang Tsung (Cary-Hiroyuki Tagawa). He defeats Sub-Zero and Reptile in combat, and then is victorious over Tsung in the final battle. As a result of the film's style the relationship between Liu Kang and Kitana is more of a metaphysical than a romantic nature. Shou stated that the fight against Reptile (played by Keith Cooke) was the most memorable, as he had suffered a rib injury shooting a scene in which Liu Kang is thrown backfirst into a pillar. The take in which he was injured was used in the final cut, as Shou felt that viewers would notice his pain during the fight. In retrospective, Shou commented that the production team managed to "find Liu Kang" during the making of the feature, with Shou's facial expressions fitting their criteria. Randy Hamilton voiced Liu Kang in Mortal Kombat: The Journey Begins, a straight-to-video animated prequel released four months prior to the film.

Shou and Talisa Soto (Kitana) were the only two actors to reprise their roles from the first film in the 1997 sequel Mortal Kombat: Annihilation. In the sequel, Liu Kang joins the Earthrealm warriors to stop Shao Kahn's menace.

Brian Tee played Liu Kang in the 2013 second season of director Kevin Tancharoen's web series Mortal Kombat: Legacy. Liu Kang is depicted therein as an anti-hero fighting for Outworld rather than Earthrealm, before which he is shown to have left a monastery to live a normal life working at a diner with his fiancée, but after she is shot and killed during a robbery, he becomes consumed with anger and revenge and further distances himself from Kung Lao and the ideals he was taught. After working as a freelance assassin for a few years, he is approached by Shang Tsung, who convinces him that humanity is not worth protecting and asks him to join the realm of Outworld in the upcoming Mortal Kombat tournament, to which he agrees. In the series' final episode, he easily subdues Johnny Cage and Kurtis Stryker during the tournament before being confronted by Kung Lao, who is surprised at his old friend's change of allegiance.

Liu Kang was played by Ludi Lin in the 2021 reboot film Mortal Kombat. An orphaned street child now living as a warrior monk and protege of Raiden, Liu Kang guides Earthrealm's warriors towards discovering their abilities. After his friend and shī xiōng Kung Lao is murdered by Shang Tsung, he avenges him through killing Kabal.

Liu Kang is one of the lead characters in the 1996 animated series Mortal Kombat: Defenders of the Realm, and was voiced by Brian Tochi. He is not the protagonist as opposed to the game storyline, instead sharing this role with several other Earthrealm heroes.

In 1996, Toy Island published a Liu Kang action figure which had a white shirt. Two Liu Kang action figures from Shaolin Monks were released by Jazwares. Apart from being flexible, both figures included different types of weapons such as swords and axes.

Jordan Rodrigues voiced the role of Liu Kang who appeared as one of the lead characters in the 2020 animated movie Mortal Kombat Legends: Scorpion's Revenge. He, Sonya and Cage reprise their role from the first Mortal Kombat game with Scorpion's aid. Rodrigues reprises his role in the sequel Mortal Kombat Legends: Battle of the Realms as the film's central protagonist.

Reception

The character has received mostly very positive response by gaming publications. Liu Kang topped UGO Networks' 2012 list of the top fifty Mortal Kombat characters and placed 94th on their 2008 list of the "top 100 heroes of all time".GameSpot featured him in their 2009 poll for the title of "All Time Greatest Game Hero", in which he lost to Yoshi. In 2012, GamesRadar ranked him as 51st "most memorable, influential, and badass" protagonist in games, adding that while "Sub-Zero and Scorpion may get most of the fanfare", Liu Kang "can shoot fireballs, whoops and hollers just like Bruce Lee, and pioneered the Animality with his dragon-transformation fatality--it’s no wonder that Liu Kang’s the chosen champion of Earthrealm." Digital Spy listed him as the 13th best Mortal Kombat character comparing him with Street Fighter character Ryu, stating they while both are "kind of dull", they develop appealing techniques across their respective series. Complex listed Liu Kang as the third best character in the franchise based on his heroic traits, moves as well as his undead form. His relationship with Kitana was ranked fourth in IGN's list of best video game couples in 2006.

Like all the characters from Mortal Kombat vs. DC Universe, Liu Kang was selected to be a playable character based on his popularity. Jesse Schedeen of IGN said that "it just wouldn't be right having a game without [Liu Kang]," noting him to be as fierce as the DC Universe characters in this game. In 2010, GamePlayBook ranked Liu Kang as the second best Mortal Kombat character, commenting that "his nimbleness and fighting expertise make him an ideal pick" and how he is as good as zombie as when he was alive.

Upon his death in Deadly Alliance, IGN's Jeremy Dunham noted that Liu Kang was killed as the series needed "'starting over' mentality", as he regarded Liu Kang as the series' strongest character. Complex remarked that the Mortal Kombat developers "finally found their groove again with Deadly Alliance, which began by snapping Liu Kang's neck." Game Informer listed his death in their article about "characters that died under our watch" calling it a "shock" as Liu Kang was stated to be one of the "most loved" characters from the series.

His redesign in Mortal Kombat: Deception was praised by GameSpot for being one of the best ones from the title, and was featured in GamesRadar's list of the "greatest zombie triumphs" in 2009, but was also ranked as the ninth-worst Mortal Kombat character by ScrewAttack in 2011. Additionally, GamesRadar used Liu Kang as an example of a stereotype of gaming heroes who reveal an evil alter ego that ruins the character's appealing traits, and considered him to be "a little like the Shaolin version of Goku, in that he's saved his world countless times and come back from the dead even more frequently." GamesRadar featured him, Fei-Long and Tekken's Marshall Law in the article about "kickass Bruce Lee clones" citing his similarities with Bruce Lee and with one of his shouts featured in famous quotes.

Liu Kang's darker characterization starting with Deception and in the reboot were received with good critical response as Den of Geek listed him as the 22nd best Mortal Kombat character due to this aspect. Both Den of Geek and Hardcore Gamer found Liu Kang's possible role in the series to be shrouded in mystery due to his possible revival as a villain as well as how he is not available to face Shinnok as in the first games created for the series. In regards to his and Kitana's role in Mortal Kombat 11, Escapist Magazine found it confusing as a result of Liu Kang's transformation into a god and the couple becoming rulers of time. Game Revolution enjoyed Liu Kang's ending in the Mortal Kombat 11 and thus wondered which of his two endings where he allies with either Raiden or Kitana would be taken as canonical. GamesPCN found Liu Kang's development in the game touching due to the handling of his character to the point gamers looked forward to his best ending which was difficult to achieve. Upon God Liu Kang's inclusion in the game as playable, Game Revolution compared it with Ryu's evil persona from Street Fighter. Both Shack News and Even Thubs enjoyed the actions Liu Kang makes as a God due to the major direction the narrative takes in the DLC Aftermath as he aims to restart the generation. Den of Geek commented that Liu Kang's role as a protagonist in Mortal Kombat 11 was well handled as he fitted the heroic role through his transformation into the God of Fire and Lightning.

Gameplay and finishing moves
Liu Kang's famous finishing move of turning into a dragon was ranked by ScrewAttack as the second best in the series, referred to as the most iconic Fatality in Mortal Kombat II, but his cartwheel Fatality from the original Mortal Kombat was ranked by ScrewAttack as the second worst in the series. Liu Kang's dragon Fatality has been listed as one of the best Fatalities from the series by both Game Informer and UGO in 2010, as well as by Complex in 2013. On the other hand, his Fatality in which he drops a Mortal Kombat arcade machine onto his opponent were pointed by both Game Informer and GamePro as one of the worst from the series, even as GamesRadar listed it among the reasons of Liu Kang being "boss".

Some video game publications criticized his gameplay and shouts while others noted him to be entertaining. IGN's Douglas Perry wrote that he preferred Liu Kang over Kung Lao as a playable character in Shaolin Monks because of his "intuitive fighting moves," adding that his shouts were "annoying" yet "strangely pleasing." GameDaily too complained about his voice, saying that "Liu Kang screams out like a chicken," and GamesRadar wrote that "the strange squeals he emits during his trademark Bicycle Kick move are unforgettable." Nevertheless, Mary Shearman from 100 Entertainers Who Changed America: An Encyclopedia of Pop Culture considered that Bruce Lee himself used to make animal noises when attacking.

Further reading

Notes

References

External links

Action film characters
Fictional murdered people
Bruceploitation characters
Deity characters in video games
Emperor and empress characters in video games
Fictional Buddhist monks
Fictional Chinese people in video games
Fictional Choy Li Fut practitioners
Fictional Hou Quan practitioners
Fictional Jeet Kune Do practitioners
Fictional Lóng Xíng Mó Qiáo practitioners
Fictional Pào Chuí practitioners
Fictional Shaolin kung fu practitioners
Fictional characters with immortality
Fictional gods
Fictional male martial artists
Fictional martial artists in video games
Fictional nunchakuka
Fictional pacifists
Fictional slaves in video games
Fictional swordfighters in video games
Male characters in comics
Male characters in video games
Male video game villains
Mortal Kombat characters
Orphan characters in video games
Religious worker characters in video games
Science fantasy video game characters
Shapeshifter characters in video games
Video game antagonists
Video game characters based on real people
Video game characters introduced in 1992
Video game characters with fire or heat abilities
Video game characters with slowed ageing
Video game mascots
Video game protagonists
Zombie and revenant characters in video games